The Danish Financial Supervisory Authority (DFSA) is the financial regulatory authority of the Danish government responsible for the regulation of financial markets in Denmark.

Finanstilsynet is part of the Ministry of Economic and Business Affairs and also acts as secretariat for the Financial Business Council, the Danish Securities Council and the Money and Pension Panel.

History
Finanstilsynet was established on the 1 Jan 1988 with the merger of the Supervisory Authority for Banks and Savings Banks and the Insurance Supervisory Authority.

In January 1990, the Supervisory Authority for Mortgage Credit Institutions was transferred to Finanstilsyne from the Danish Housing Agency.  However political responsibility for mortgage credit remained with the ministry of housing and so Finanstilsynet reported to both the Minister for Housing and the Minister for Economic Affairs until 1994 when political responsibility was passed to the Minister for Economic Affairs.

In November 2001 the Ministry of Economic Affairs merged with the Ministry of Business and Industry.  Since then the Minister of Economic and Business Affairs has been responsible for Finanstilsynet.

Responsibilities and functions
It is responsible for regulation, supervision and collecting statistics of financial participants.  These include; banks, stock exchanges, securities and money market brokers, clearing and registration organizations, insurance companies, pension funds, insurance brokers, investment companies and investment associations.

Its stated aims are to:
 strengthen the market's role as a disciplinary factor through enhanced transparency
 intensify management's consideration of the risk profile
 improve consumers' possibilities to compare prices and products among companies.

Organization structure
Finanstilsynet is run by an executive management team that report to the minister of Economic and business affairs.  The executive is made up of a Director general and three deputy director generals.  Each deputy is assigned a subsection of the responsibilities of the agency.

International 
Finanstilsynet is a member of the European Securities and Markets Authority (ESMA), which is actively contributing to the harmonisation of financial regulation in Europe.

Finanstilsynet is also a member of the International Organization of Securities Commissions (IOSCO), and is a signatory of the IOSCO multilateral Memorandum of Understanding (MoU) to cooperate with other countries securities commissions.

See also
Danmarks Nationalbank
Economy of Denmark
Securities Commission
:Category:Banks of Denmark

References

External links 

Government of Denmark
Government agencies of Denmark
Financial regulatory authorities of Denmark